Iganjo is an administrative ward in the Mbeya Urban district of the Mbeya Region of Tanzania. In 2016 the Tanzania National Bureau of Statistics report there were 9,585 people in the ward, from 8,697 in 2012.

Neighborhoods 
The ward has 6 neighborhoods.
 Ikhanga
 Ilowe
 Ishinga
 Itanji
 Mtakuja
 Mwanyanje

References 

Wards of Mbeya Region